Tujak (also Romanized as Tūjak; also known as Tūrjak) is a village in Zarabad-e Sharqi Rural District, Zarabad District, Konarak County, Sistan and Baluchestan Province, Iran. At the 2006 census, its population was 37, in 11 families.

References 

Populated places in Konarak County